Panama City Mall was a single story enclosed shopping mall in Panama City, Florida. Opened in 1976, it featured J. C. Penney, Gayfers, and Sears as its anchor stores. It is owned and managed by Hendon Properties of Atlanta as of September 2013, purchased from CBL & Associates Properties. The mall closed due to Hurricane Michael and received major damages. It will not be reopening. However, a possible redevelopment of the site was proposed in July 2020 for a potential redevelopment for an open-air retail center with a hotel, residential apartments and office space much like Pier Park to the west in Panama City Beach

History
The mall, built by Charles N. Agree, opened in August 1976 with Sears and Gayfers as its anchor stores.

An East Wing, and J.C. Penney anchor store, was completed in November 1982. The Gayfers store was rebranded by Dillard's in 1999.

Cost Plus World Market and Linens 'n Things were both added to the mall in the late 2000s, resulting in the relocation of existing stores. Linens 'n Things became Bed Bath & Beyond, while Cost Plus World Market has since moved to Pier Park at Panama City Beach, Florida. Planet Fitness opened next to Dillard's

In 2015, Sears Holdings spun off 235 of its properties, including the Sears at Panama City Mall, into Seritage Growth Properties.

On October 15, 2018, Sears announced that it will be closing its location at the mall in the future, after Sears declared Chapter 11 bankruptcy.

On December 5, 2018 owner Hendon Properties announced the permanent closure of the mall, citing costs to rebuild as the primary factor after catastrophic damage from Hurricane Michael. Dillard's and JCPenney announced their locations would be repaired and reopened as stand-alone stores in 2019. Dillard’s reopened in October 2018, with reduced store hours, and has since returned to normal hours. On August 30, 2019 J.C. Penney reopened for business, Bed Bath & Beyond has closed and consolidated to its Pier Park North location as of Spring 2019.

On July 31, 2020, JCPenney put 21 stores up for sale, this one included.
As of Saturday December 17, 2022 Planet Fitness relocated next to Kohl’s near Target and Denny’s on Martin Luther King Jr. Boulevard

Anchors

Current anchors
Dillard's (1999–present)
JCPenney (November 1982 – present)
VIP PC Cinemas, Inc. (2017-present)

Former anchors
Bed Bath & Beyond (2008-2019)
Cost Plus World Market
Gayfers (August 10, 1976 – 1999)
Linens 'n Things (until 2008)
Sears (August 10, 1976- October 15, 2018)
 Planet Fitness (open from 2015-2022, closed in December 2022 and relocated next to Kohl’s on Martin Luther King Jr. Boulevard near Target and Denny’s

References

External links
Panama City Mall

Shopping malls established in 1976
Shopping malls in Florida
Buildings and structures in Panama City, Florida
Tourist attractions in Bay County, Florida
Charles N. Agree buildings
Shopping malls disestablished in 2018